The Drop is a 2014 novel by Dennis Lehane. It was adapted from a feature film of the same name, released in September 2014, and the last film of James Gandolfini.  The film was an adaptation of a 2009 short story by Lehane, "Animal Rescue".

Novelizations 

 Novelization of The Drop (2014), film directed by Michaël R. Roskam, based on short story "Animal Rescue"

References

2014 American novels
Novels by Dennis Lehane
Novels based on films
William Morrow and Company books